The Roscoe Hamilton House, on Buena Vista Rd. near Lancaster, Kentucky, is a Greek Revival-style house.  It was listed on the National Register of Historic Places in 1985.

It is a two-story, five bay central passage plan frame house with brick interior end chimneys.  It has a pedimented portico and a one-story ell.  It dates from c.1850-1860.

References

Houses on the National Register of Historic Places in Kentucky
Greek Revival architecture in Kentucky
Houses in Garrard County, Kentucky
Houses completed in 1855
Central-passage houses
National Register of Historic Places in Garrard County, Kentucky
1855 establishments in Kentucky